Leon is a city in Butler County, Kansas, United States.  As of the 2020 census, the population of the city was 669.

History
Leon was founded in 1879. It was named after Leon, Iowa. The first building, built in 1879, was the blacksmith shop of H. Belton. Leon was incorporated as a city in 1882.

Geography
Leon is located at  (37.689516, -96.783109). Leon is located in Little Walnut Township, Butler County, Kansas, and it is its principal city.

Demographics

2010 census
As of the census of 2010, there were 704 people, 264 households, and 188 families residing in the city. The racial makeup of the city was 91.9% White, 0.6% African American, 2.0% Native American, 0.3% Asian, 1.6% from other races, and 3.7% from two or more races. Hispanic or Latino of any race were 3.0% of the population.

There were 264 households, of which 38.3% had children under the age of 18 living with them, 50.0% were married couples living together, 11.7% had a female householder with no husband present, 9.5% had a male householder with no wife present, and 28.8% were non-families. 25.8% of all households were made up of individuals, and 14% had someone living alone who was 65 years of age or older. The average household size was 2.67 and the average family size was 3.13.

The median age in the city was 34.6 years. 30.3% of residents were under the age of 18; 8.3% were between the ages of 18 and 24; 22.1% were from 25 to 44; 24.1% were from 45 to 64; and 15.2% were 65 years of age or older. The gender makeup of the city was 50.6% male and 49.4% female.

2000 census
As of the census of 2000, there were 645 people, 245 households, and 175 families residing in the city. The racial makeup of the city was 93.64% White, 0.62% African American, 1.71% Native American, 1.55% from other races, and 2.48% from two or more races. Hispanic or Latino of any race were 4.96% of the population.

There were 245 households, out of which 38.4% had children under the age of 18 living with them, 57.6% were married couples living together, 10.6% had a female householder with no husband present, and 28.2% were non-families. 24.5% of all households were made up of individuals, and 11.8% had someone living alone who was 65 years of age or older. The average household size was 2.63 and the average family size was 3.18.

In the city, the population was spread out, with 31.6% under the age of 18, 7.4% from 18 to 24, 27.9% from 25 to 44, 19.2% from 45 to 64, and 13.8% who were 65 years of age or older. The median age was 33 years. For every 100 females, there were 89.1 males. For every 100 females age 18 and over, there were 95.1 males.

The median income for a household in the city was $40,089, and the median income for a family was $48,000. Males had a median income of $35,938 versus $25,859 for females. The per capita income for the city was $18,953. About 6.7% of families and 6.6% of the population were below the poverty line, including 6.6% of those under age 18 and 12.8% of those age 65 or over.

Education
The community is served by Bluestem USD 205 public school district.  The Bluestem High School mascot is Lions.

Prior to school unification, the Leon High School mascot was also Lions. The Leon Lions won the following Kansas State High School championships:
 1948 Boys Track & Field - Class B 
 1949 Boys Track & Field - Class B 
 1965 Boys Cross Country - Class B 
2017 KSHSAA Class 2A-1A State Champions Baseball

References

Further reading

External links

 City of Leon
 Leon - Directory of Public Officials
 Leon City Map, KDOT

Cities in Kansas
Cities in Butler County, Kansas
Wichita, KS Metropolitan Statistical Area
Populated places established in 1879
1879 establishments in Kansas